Eugenio Bertoglio (24 April 1929 – 2020) was an Italian racing cyclist. He rode in the 1955 Tour de France.

References

External links
 

1929 births
2020 deaths
Italian male cyclists
Place of birth missing
Cyclists from Buenos Aires
Argentine male cyclists